Lennonville is a derelict town in Western Australia near the town of Mount Magnet, established in 1898.

Lennonville was gazetted in 1896, after gold having been found two years earlier at the location by prospectors Lennon and Palmer.

At the peak of its existence, at the turn of the 20th century, the town had a population of 3,000 and five hotels, outperforming nearby Mount Magnet and Boogardie. By 1909, however, the town was already in decline and, after a huge fire swept through the main street of the town, a general exodus begun. Today, the most predominant reminder of the towns former glory is the railway platform.

References 

Mining towns in Western Australia
Ghost towns in the Mid West of Western Australia
Shire of Mount Magnet